The I Velká cena Československa was a Grand Prix motor race which was held at Masaryk Circuit on 25 September 1949. The race was won by Peter Whitehead driving a Ferrari 125.
Czechoslovak driver Václav Uher died in crash during practice. Giuseppe Farina crashed into spectators in the first lap of the race and killed two of them. Tatraplan of Bruno Sojka was in streamlined configuration.

Race

References

Czechoslovakian